Renew is a European four-year project (2004–07) to prove different concepts of fuel production from biomass. Established and funded by the European Unions Sixth Framework Programme in January 2004, the Renew consortium consisted of 33 partners from 9 European countries. More than half of the partners are industrial enterprises, remaining are research and development institutes, with the special expertise needed to perform the individual R&D tasks.

The project divided into six sub-projects, four of which were dedicated to the optimisation and analysis of the fuel production process and production routes for biofuels from lignocellulosic feedstock, also known as second generation biofuel.

Partners

Automotive industry 
 Volkswagen, Wolfsburg, Germany
 Daimler Chrysler, Stuttgart, Germany
 Renault through REGIENOV, Boulogne Billancourt, France
 Volvo through VTEC, Gothenburg, Sweden

R&D institutes and universities 
 AICIA (Asociacion de investigacion Y Cooperacion Industrial de Andalucia), Seville, Spain
 CERTH (National Centre for Research and Technology-Hellas), Thermi, Thessaloniki, Greece
 CRES (Center for Renewable Energy Sources), Pikermi, Greece
 CUTEC, Clausthal-Zellerfeld, Germany
 EEE (Europäisches Zentrum für Erneuerbare Energie), Güssing, Austria
 Lunds Universitet Dept. of Environmental and Energy System Studies, Lund, Sweden 
 Forschungszentrum Karlsruhe Institut für technische Chemie, Karlsruhe, Germany
 IEE (Institute of Energy and Environment), Leipzig, Germany
 INiG (Instytut Nafty i Gazu), Kraków, Poland
 ITN (Instytut Technoligii Nafty; English: Institute of Petroleum Processing), Kraków, Poland
 PSI (Paul Scherrer Institute), Villingen, Switzerland
 TUV (Technische Universität Wien), Vienna, Austria
 ZSW (Center for Solar Energy and Hydrogen Research), Stuttgart, Germany

Fuel distribution 
 BP, Bochum, Germany
 Total, Paris La Défense, France

Plant engineering and construction 
 Chemrec, Stockholm, Sweden
 Repotec - Renewable Power Technologies Umwelttechnik, Güssing, Austria
 UET (Umwelt- und Energietechnik Freiberg), Freiberg, Germany

Plant operator 
 Abengoa, Sevilla, Spain
 Biomasse-Kraftwerk Güssing, Güssing, Austria
 Södra Cell, Mörrum, Sweden

Agriculture and forestry biomass research
 EC BREC/CLN (EC Baltic Renewable Energy Centre), Warsaw, Poland
 STFI (now Innventia), Stockholm, Sweden
 National University of Ireland, Dublin, Ireland

Services 
 B.A.U.M. Consult, Munich, Germany
 Ecotraffic, Stockholm, Sweden
 ESU-services, Uster, Switzerland 
  SYNCOM F&E Beratung, Ganderkesee, Germany

Investors 
 EDF (Electricité de France), Chatou, France

Sub-projects 
 Product optimization of BTL production
 Process optimization of BTL production
 Black liquor to DME/methanol
 Optimization of Bioethanol production
 Biofuel Assessment
 Training

External links 

 Renew website
 Renew executive summary
 Sixth Framework Programme (EU site)

Bioenergy organizations
Biofuels